Sebastián Ignacio González Valdés (born 14 December 1978), also known as Chamagol, is a Chilean former footballer who played as striker.

Club career

He began his football career at Colo-Colo of the first tier of his country, in which he scored 27 goals in 77 appearances during four seasons. In June 2002, he was sold for an undisclosed fee (believed to be a high sum) to Mexican Primera División club Atlante. In his first season with that club, the Apertura Tournament of the same year, González scored 13 goals in 19 appearances and in the following, the 2003 Clausura Tournament, he netted 16 goals in the same number of games, becoming the league's top scorer.

There were rumors saying that González was asking for more money from Atlante and that he was not happy to be there. They did give him a raise but that still did not help him want to stay on the team. He was sold to Tigres for about 3.5 million if not 4 million dollars. In the press conference he claimed that his goal was to score over 20 goals in the season. When asked by a reporter why he had chosen such a high number of goals, he responded by saying, "last season I set a number of goals as my goal, and I beat that number. So I want to beat my goal of 20 goals this season."

After a successful pass at the club of Cancún, which back then played at Estadio Azteca as well as Neza 86 Stadiums, both at Mexico City, González was sold in January 2006 to UANL Tigres of the same league and country. In the next season, was loaned to Tiburones Rojos de Veracruz and the Argentine Primera División club in that moment, Olimpo de Bahía Blanca. In 2008, he signed for Liga de Ascenso of Mexican side León, in where was received by several fans in his first training of the club. In January of the next year, he returned to Colo-Colo on loan, being presented in European style by the team's captain Arturo Sanhueza. In his third game for the club, González scored a goal in an historic 3–1 away win over Palmeiras at Parque Antártica.

He joined Cypriot First Division side APOP Kinyras FC, after an unsuccessful season in Colo-Colo, returning in mid-year to Mexico for play in Atlante's filial team Potros Neza, scoring eight goals in 27 games for the Liga de Ascenso tournament. Despite of his performance and the will of the Chilean to play again for the first team and stay at Mexico, Atlante did not consider González for the first squad due to his lack of form according to that club's coach, and he signed for the Bolivian giants The Strongest. He is currently signed to Venezuelan club Caracas FC after a successful stint in Bolivia. After just playing nine matches without scoring for the Venezuelan giants despite belong considered one of the most promising signings of the club, González returned to Chile to play for Palestino in the Chilean Primera División; he argued his decision to end his career scoring seven goals which would leave him at 200 goals in his career. Despite his desire to either retire at Atlante or Colo-Colo, where he is considered historic, González said that he was thankful to be received by Palestino as he was willing to return to Chile. He is currently training to be a coach as well.

International goals
González played internationally with the Chile national football team at the 2000 Summer Olympics at Sydney, winning the bronze medal also, and in the 2004 Copa América celebrated in Peru. He has scored six goals for his national team, being two of those officials against Paraguay and Peru.

International goals

Personal life
González is the nephew of the Chilean former international footballer Francisco Chamaco Valdés, a historical player of Colo-Colo. Due to the nickname of his uncle, he is known as Chamagol.

Post retirement

He graduated as a Sport Manager. In 2021, he was in charge of Deportes Iberia as Sports Director. In 2022 he assumed the charge of Sports Manager of Deportes Recoleta.

Honours

Club
Colo-Colo
 Primera División de Chile: 1998, 2002 Clausura

The Strongest
 Bolivian Primera División: 2011 Apertura

International
Chile
 Bronze medal (1): 2000 Summer Olympics

References

External links
 Sebastián González at Football-Lineups.com
 
 

1978 births
Living people
Sportspeople from Viña del Mar
Chilean footballers
Chilean expatriate footballers
Chile international footballers
Olympic footballers of Chile
Olympic bronze medalists for Chile
Footballers at the 2000 Summer Olympics
2004 Copa América players
Colo-Colo footballers
Colo-Colo B footballers
Atlante F.C. footballers
Tigres UANL footballers
C.D. Veracruz footballers
Olimpo footballers
Tecos F.C. footballers
Club León footballers
APOP Kinyras FC players
The Strongest players
Caracas FC players
Club Deportivo Palestino footballers
Deportes Temuco footballers
Chilean Primera División players
Tercera División de Chile players
Primera B de Chile players
Liga MX players
Argentine Primera División players
Ascenso MX players
Cypriot First Division players
Bolivian Primera División players
Venezuelan Primera División players
Expatriate footballers in Mexico
Expatriate footballers in Argentina
Expatriate footballers in Cyprus
Expatriate footballers in Bolivia
Expatriate footballers in Venezuela
Chilean expatriate sportspeople in Mexico
Chilean expatriate sportspeople in Argentina
Chilean expatriate sportspeople in Cyprus
Chilean expatriate sportspeople in Bolivia
Chilean expatriate sportspeople in Venezuela
Olympic medalists in football
Medalists at the 2000 Summer Olympics
Association football forwards
Canal del Fútbol color commentators
Chilean radio personalities
Chilean association football commentators